Sabina Jeyasingham (born 17 November 1993), known professionally as Sabby Jey, is a New Zealand, Sri Lankan Tamil actress, model, television personality, and advocate. She is best known for her work in Tamil cinema and in 2018 debuted Karthikeyanum Kaanamal Pona Kadhileyumin.

Jey has been an active petite model since 2014. In 2021, Jey was a contestant on The Bachelor New Zealand Season 3 produced by Warner Brothers. In 2022, she was one of the lead cast in the Ex Best Thing on TV2. 

Jey came out in the media in 2022 as a sexual assault victim and rallied for consent awareness.

Early life 
She was born in Auckland, New Zealand after her parents emigrated from Sri Lanka as refugee. She has a Bachelor of Business majoring in International Business and Finance from Auckland University of Technology (AUT). She is fluent in Tamil and English.

Career 
In 2022, Jey was one of the lead cast in the Ex Best Thing on TV2. The premise being that two ex-lovers help each other move on by learning from their previous mistakes and setting each other up with potential suitable love matches.

Jey traveled to Chennai, India after studying and was managed by Nikkil Murugan who had previously worked with Rajinikanth and Kamal Hassan.

Her first Kollywood feature film debut in 2018; "Kaadhal Nagaram" which was later renamed Karthikeyanum Kaanamal Pona Kadhaliyum alongside actor Pandi and Jangiri Madhumitha. She was a lead in an unreleased Tamil film named "Street Fighter", which was directed by new director Moses. She later signed with Gail Cowan Management.

She founded Sabby Jey Social Limited in May 2018 where she offers digital marketing services. In early 2019 she collaborated with Maybelline New York’s as a face for the Fit Me Foundation extended range. 

Jey also modelled in Beijing Fashion Week and on the great wall of China.

Media 
Jey is a social media influencer and content creator with over 30 thousand followers.

Jey is known for advocating against colourism in the industry and was part of the ‘Dark Is Beautiful’ campaign. She was also a brand ambassador and key opinion leader for Huawei in 2018. Jey admitted to cosmetic surgery including a rhinoplasty and genioplasty. 

In 2022, Jey gained public attention following a public Tribunal case against her landlord. She claimed that the rental property she was paying for was not up to filming standards, despite being a residential property. Jey and Gao ultimately lost the case, with the Tribunal ruling in favour of their landlord. In August 2022, Jey revealed in an interview that she was diagnosed with PTSD from a sexual assault.

Filmography

See also 
 Tamil New Zealanders
 List of Sri Lankan Tamils
 Sri Lankan New Zealanders
 List of Tamil film actresses
 List of Sri Lankan actors and actresses
 List of New Zealand actors

References

External links 
Sabby Jey on IMDb
Sabby Jey Acting Profile
Sabby Jey Brand Partnership Profile 
Actor’s Agent Association of New Zealand Profile - AAANZ (New Zealand) 

1993 births
21st-century New Zealand actresses
21st-century Sri Lankan actresses
Actresses in Tamil cinema
Living people
New Zealand female models
New Zealand people of Sri Lankan Tamil descent
Sri Lankan female models
Sri Lankan Tamil actresses
New Zealand entertainers
Sri Lankan Tamil women